One third of Stevenage Borough Council in Hertfordshire, England is elected each year, followed by one year when there is an election to Hertfordshire County Council instead.

Political control

Leadership
The leaders of the council since 1974 have been:

Council elections
1973 Stevenage Borough Council election
1976 Stevenage Borough Council election
1979 Stevenage Borough Council election (New ward boundaries)
1980 Stevenage Borough Council election
1982 Stevenage Borough Council election
1983 Stevenage Borough Council election
1984 Stevenage Borough Council election (Borough boundary changes took place but the number of seats remained the same)
1986 Stevenage Borough Council election
1987 Stevenage Borough Council election (Borough boundary changes took place but the number of seats remained the same)
1988 Stevenage Borough Council election
1990 Stevenage Borough Council election
1991 Stevenage Borough Council election
1992 Stevenage Borough Council election
1994 Stevenage Borough Council election
1995 Stevenage Borough Council election
1996 Stevenage Borough Council election
1998 Stevenage Borough Council election
1999 Stevenage Borough Council election (New ward boundaries)
2000 Stevenage Borough Council election
2002 Stevenage Borough Council election
2003 Stevenage Borough Council election
2004 Stevenage Borough Council election
2006 Stevenage Borough Council election
2007 Stevenage Borough Council election
2008 Stevenage Borough Council election
2010 Stevenage Borough Council election
2011 Stevenage Borough Council election
2012 Stevenage Borough Council election
2014 Stevenage Borough Council election
2015 Stevenage Borough Council election
2016 Stevenage Borough Council election
2018 Stevenage Borough Council election
2019 Stevenage Borough Council election
2021 Stevenage Borough Council election
2022 Stevenage Borough Council election

Borough result maps

By-election results

References

 Stevenage election results
 By-election results

External links
Stevenage Borough Council

 
Stevenage
Politics of Stevenage
Council elections in Hertfordshire